"Electric Vendetta" is the third episode of the fourth season of Midsomer Murders and the sixteenth episode overall. It stars John Nettles as Detective Chief Inspector Tom Barnaby and Daniel Casey as Detective Sergeant Gavin Troy, where in a long-held grudge of forty years triggers a series of deaths disguised as alien abductions.

The episode is notable for the fact that one of the deaths is not adequately explained in the denouement due to a mistake in the editing process.

Plot 
The episode involves crop circles. A man is found in the middle of one such circle, naked, with two puncture wounds on his back and the back of his head shaved. A local Ufologist claims extra terrestrial involvement but DCI Tom Barnaby looks for a more plausible explanation.

When a series of bodies are found in mysterious crop circles in the cornfields of Sir Harry Chatwyn, squire of the village of Midsomer Parva, it looks like a case of extra terrestrial kidnapping. Two bodies, bearing the classic hallmarks of alien abduction – burnt fingers, a puncture wound to the lower back and a chunk cut out of the hair - seem to provide evidence that UFOs do exist.

But when Inspector Barnaby and Sergeant Troy dig deeper, it seems there could be a far more simple explanation for these deaths – cold blooded murder motivated by greed, love and jealousy. It’s another tangled web to be unravelled in one of the Midsomer villages by Barnaby and his faithful sidekick.

The deaths 
Ronald Stokes - accidentally electrocuted himself
Eddie Field - electrocuted at foundry. His death was never adequately explained in the episode. Producers later revealed the explanation had been forgotten in editing. 
Steve Ramsey - murdered by electrocution
Lloyd Kirby - thrown down stairs. Body dumped in crop circle by Dave and Sally.
Lady Isabel Aubrey - natural causes
Dave Rippert - killed in accidental collision with combine harvester

Midsomer Murders episodes
2001 British television episodes